Minimum capital is a concept used in corporate law and banking regulation to stipulate what assets the organisation must hold as a minimum requirement. The purpose of minimum capital in corporate law is to ensure that in the event of insolvency or financial instability, the corporation has a sufficient equity base to satisfy the claims of creditors.

Corporate law
All public companies within the European Union are required to hold at least €25,000 in capital, although many countries go above this minimum requirement. The requirement is e.g. £50.000 in the United Kingdoms (England and Wales), of which at least 25% must be paid up (of the nominal amount and of any premium).

Banking regulation

Basel II
Capital Requirements Directive
Leverage (finance)

See also
Banking regulation
Corporate law
UK insolvency law

References

J Armour, 'Legal Capital: An Outdated Concept?' (2006) 7 EBOR 5

External links
Capstone Capital Group

United Kingdom company law
Capital requirement